The Act of Killing (meaning "Butcher") is a 2012 documentary film about individuals who participated in the Indonesian mass killings of 1965–1966. The film is directed by Joshua Oppenheimer, and co-directed by Christine Cynn and an anonymous Indonesian. A co-production between Denmark, Norway and the United Kingdom, it is presented by Final Cut for Real in Denmark and produced by Signe Byrge Sørensen, with Werner Herzog, Errol Morris, Joram ten Brink and Andre Singer in executive producer roles. It is a Centre for Research and Education in Arts and Media (CREAM) project of the University of Westminster.

The Act of Killing won the 2013 European Film Award for Best Documentary, the Asia Pacific Screen Award, and was nominated for the Academy Award for Best Documentary Feature at the 86th Academy Awards. It also won best documentary at the 67th British Academy Film Awards. In accepting, Oppenheimer said that the United States and the United Kingdom have "collective responsibility" for "participating in and ignoring" the crimes, which was omitted from the video BAFTA posted online. This participation has been extensively documented by numerous professional historians, journalists and an international tribunal, and documents declassified in 2021 indicate that the UK was even more closely involved than previously thought. After a screening for US Congress members, Oppenheimer demanded that the US acknowledge its role in the killings.

The Indonesian government responded negatively; its presidential spokesman on foreign affairs, Teuku Faizasyah, claimed that the film is misleading with respect to its portrayal of the country.

A companion film, The Look of Silence, was released in 2014. The film was ranked 19th on a list of the best documentaries ever made in a 2015 poll by the British Film Institute. In 2016, it was named the 14th greatest film released since 2000 by a poll of critics published by the BBC.

Synopsis 
The film focuses on the perpetrators of the Indonesian mass killings of 1965–1966 in the present day. The genocide led to the killing of almost a million people, ostensibly for belonging to the local communist community. When Suharto overthrew Sukarno, the President of Indonesia, following the failed coup of the 30 September Movement in 1965, the gangsters Anwar Congo and Adi Zulkadry in Medan (North Sumatra) were promoted from selling black market movie theatre tickets to leading the most powerful death squad in North Sumatra. They also extorted money from the ethnic Chinese as the price for keeping their lives. Anwar is said to have personally killed 1000 people.

Today, Anwar is revered by the right wing of a paramilitary organization, Pemuda Pancasila, that grew out of the death squads. The organization is so powerful that its leaders include government ministers who are openly involved in corruption, election rigging and clearing people from their land for developers.

Invited by Oppenheimer, Anwar recounts his experiences killing for the cameras, and makes scenes depicting their memories and feelings about the killings. The scenes are produced in the style of their favorite films: gangster, Western, and musical. Various aspects of Anwar and his friends' filmmaking process are shown, but as they dig into Anwar's personal experiences, the reenacted scenes begin to take over the narrative. Oppenheimer has called the result "a documentary of the imagination".

Some of Anwar's friends state that the killings were wrong, while others worry about the consequences of the story on their public image.

After Anwar plays a victim, he cannot continue. Oppenheimer, from behind the camera, states that it was worse for the victims because they knew they were going to be killed, whereas Anwar was only acting. Anwar then expresses doubts over whether or not he has sinned, tearfully saying he does not want to think about it. He revisits the rooftop where he claims many of his killings took place, and retches repeatedly while describing how he had killed people during the genocide. The dancers from the film's theatrical poster are seen before the credits begin to roll.

Production 
In 2001, while conducting interviews for their 2003 film The Globalisation Tapes, Oppenheimer and Cynn began delving into the Indonesian mass killings of 1965–1966. After moving up the ranks of those involved with the killings, Oppenheimer's interviews led him to meet Anwar Congo in 2005. The film was shot mostly in Medan, North Sumatra, Indonesia, between 2005 and 2011. After seeing an early preview of The Act of Killing, filmmakers Werner Herzog and Errol Morris signed on as executive producers.

Many of the people who worked on the film are not credited by name, instead appearing as "Anonymous," for fear of both legal and extrajudicial retribution for their participation.

Release 

Coinciding with the release of the film's director's cut in 2013, a free BitTorrent Bundle of behind the scenes content was uploaded to the internet by the distributor.

Reception

Critical response 
The Act of Killing received widespread acclaim from critics. The review aggregator website Rotten Tomatoes reported a 95% approval rating with an average rating of 8.80/10 based on 156 reviews. The website's consensus reads, "Raw, terrifying, and painfully difficult to watch, The Act of Killing offers a haunting testament to the edifying, confrontational power of documentary cinema." On Metacritic, the film holds an average score of 91 out of 100, based on 33 reviews, indicating "universal acclaim."

Nick Schager of The Village Voice called it a "masterpiece." Pulitzer Prize-winning journalist Chris Hedges called the film "an important exploration of the complex psychology of mass murderers" and wrote that "it is not the demonized, easily digestible caricature of a mass murderer that most disturbs us. It is the human being." Award-winning filmmaker Ruhi Hamid said: "It is the most extraordinary film I have ever seen. It actually turns around what we think of as documentaries. ...an extraordinary record of a horrendous part of Indonesian history."

In some quarters Oppenheimer has been accused of treating his subjects in bad faith. As far as their goal at the beginning was to glorify mass murder, Oppenheimer responds that could never have been his goal, therefore that side of them may have been betrayed. In an interview with The Village Voice, Oppenheimer said: "When I was entrusted by this community of survivors to film these justifications, to film these boastings, I was trying to expose and interrogate the nature of impunity. Boasting about killing was the right material to do that with because it is a symptom of impunity."

Australian National University Professor of Asian History and Politics Robert Cribb stated that the film lacks historical context. In reply, Oppenheimer said that "the film is essentially not about what happened in 1965, but rather about a regime in which genocide has, paradoxically, been effaced [yet] celebrated – in order to keep the survivors terrified, the public brainwashed, and the perpetrators able to live with themselves... It never pretends to be an exhaustive account of the events of 1965. It seeks to understand the impact of the killing and terror today, on individuals and institutions."

Bradley Simpson, historian at the University of Connecticut and director of the Indonesia/East Timor Documentation Project at the National Security Archive, states the "brilliant Oscar-nominated film" has prompted vigorous debate among Indonesians about the crimes and the need to hold responsible parties accountable, and suggests that it could have a similar effect in the United States, whose own role in the killings "has never officially been acknowledged, much less accounted for, though some of the relevant documents have been made available to the public."

An Indonesian academic, Soe Tjen Marching, analyzed the film in relation to Hannah Arendt's theory of the banality of evil.

The primary subjects in the film, Anwar Congo and Herman Koto, have seen the film and neither feels deceived, according to Oppenheimer. Oppenheimer says that upon watching the film Anwar Congo "started to cry...Tearfully, he told me: 'This is the film I expected. It's an honest film, a true film.' He said he was profoundly moved and will always remain loyal to it." Oppenheimer went on to say that in the call with Congo he also became down on himself saying "There is nothing left for me to do in life but to die". Oppenheimer seeing Congo so moved and almost ashamed for what he had done, said this to him. "You're only 70 years old, Anwar. You might live another 25 years. Whatever good you do in those years is not undermined by the awful things in your past." He felt it may have been cliche, but he felt it was honest and all he could manage to say to Congo. A subsequent interview on Al Jazeera's program 101 East revealed that Anwar had misgivings about the film and the negative reaction to it in Indonesia, which was causing problems for him. He confided these concerns directly to Oppenheimer in an apparent Skype conversation displayed within the program.

In 2015, the film was named as one of the top 50 films of the decade so far by The Guardian.

Top ten lists 
The Act of Killing has been named as one of the best films of 2013 by various critics:
 1st – Sight & Sound
 1st – The Guardian
 1st – LA Weekly
 1st – Nick Schager, The A.V. Club
 2nd – Mark Kermode, The Observer
 3rd – David Edelstein, New York
 3rd – David Sexton, London Evening Standard
 4th – Eric Kohn, Indiewire
 4th – People Magazine
 7th – Bill Goodykoontz, Arizona Republic
 7th – A. A. Dowd, The A.V. Club
 7th – David Chen, slashfilm.com
 8th – Sam Adams, The A.V. Club
 8th – Ignatiy Vishnevetsky, The A.V. Club
 8th – Richard Corliss, Time
 10th – Time Out London
 10th – Devindra Hardawar, slashfilm.com

The Act of Killing was ranked 19th among all documentaries ever made in a 2015 poll by the British Film Institute, as well as the 14th greatest film since 2000 in a 2016 critics' poll by BBC. It was ranked 16th in The Guardian'''s Best Films of the 21st Century list.

 Awards and nominations 

See also40 Years of Silence: An Indonesian Tragedy (2009)
List of films with longest production time

 References 

 External links 
 
 
 
 
 
 
 "The Act of Killing": New Film Shows U.S.-Backed Indonesian Death Squad Leaders Re-enacting Massacres. Democracy Now!'' 19 July 2013.
 Obituary: Anwar Congo, the mass killer who re-enacted his crimes. BBC. 3 November 2019

2012 films
2012 documentary films
European Film Awards winners (films)
Danish documentary films
Norwegian documentary films
British documentary films
2010s Indonesian-language films
Documentary films about the Indonesian mass killings of 1965–1966
Documentary films about psychology
Organized crime in Indonesia
Self-reflexive films
Transition to the New Order
1965 in Indonesia
Best Documentary Robert Award winners
2010s British films